Chak Sikandar station, with the station code CSR, is a railway station in the Sonpur railway division of East Central Railway. Chak Sikandar station is located at Bidupur block, within Vaishali district in the Indian state of Bihar. The station is elevated 53 meters above sea level, and contains two platforms. The Barauni–Gorakhpur, Raxaul, and Jainagar lines use Chak Sikandar Station.

See also
Desari railway station

Akshaywat Rai Nagar railway station

References

Railway stations in Vaishali district